Arthur Huggett (14 January 1861 – 14 April 1945) was an English cricketer.  Huggett's batting and bowling styles are unknown.  He was born at Godstone, Surrey.

Huggett made three first-class appearances for Sussex. He made two appearances in 1883 against Hampshire at Day's Antelope Ground, Southampton, and Yorkshire at Bramall Lane, Sheffield.  His third first-class appearance came in 1885 against Gloucestershire at the County Ground, Hove. In his three first-class matches, he scored a total of 14 runs at an average of 3.50, with a high score of 5 not out.

He died at High Brooms, Kent, on 14 April 1945.

References

External links
Arthur Huggett at ESPNcricinfo
Arthur Huggett at CricketArchive

1861 births
1945 deaths
People from Godstone
English cricketers
Sussex cricketers